Felix Miles is an English footballer who plays as a midfielder, most recently for EFL League One club Cheltenham Town. He has also played on loan at Tuffley Rovers.

Playing career
Miles came through the youth-team at Cheltenham Town. On 23 October 2020, he joined Hellenic League Premier Division club Tuffley Rovers on loan. He made his first-team debut for Cheltenham Town in a 3–0 defeat at home to Portsmouth in the EFL Trophy on 8 December 2020. In April 2021, Miles won the EFL Apprentice of the Year League Two award for 2021. During the 2021–22 season, Miles spent time on trial with Southampton and Birmingham City. On 6 May 2022, Miles was released by Cheltenham Town at the end of his scholarship.

Statistics

Honours
EFL Apprentice of the Year League Two: 2021

References

Living people
People from Stroud
English footballers
Association football midfielders
Cheltenham Town F.C. players
Tuffley Rovers F.C. players
Year of birth missing (living people)